Rustam is a 4th Tehsil in Mardan District of Khyber-Pakhtunkhwa. It is located at 34°21'0N 72°17'0E and has an altitude of 369m (1213 feet). Rustam is surrounded by the mountains of chengay baba, shabaz ghara, sar malang and Kashmir smasta. Rustam is famous for its agri products – fruits and vegetables. In education, the Rustam has recently moved forward with the establishments of private sector colleges such as Unicom College of Business Studies and Sudhum Children Academy and College. The Government High Schools for Boys and Girls are well established and many well known social contributors have taken their early education in these schools. Currently, A brand new building is under-construction for the Postgraduate Girls College.

References 

Union councils of Mardan District
Populated places in Mardan District